Pedro is an unincorporated community in Monroe County, West Virginia, United States. Pedro is located near the Virginia border, northeast of Union.

The community perhaps was named after the local Pedro family.

References

Unincorporated communities in Monroe County, West Virginia
Unincorporated communities in West Virginia